"One Arrest" is the seventh episode of the first season of the HBO original series The Wire (2002-2008). The episode was written by Rafael Alvarez from a story by David Simon and Ed Burns and was directed by Joe Chappelle. It originally aired on July 14, 2002.

Plot summary

The police 
The Barksdale detail discusses the information they have garnered from their surveillance, with Prez showing a surprising gift for decrypting messages. They have identified a resupply with a specific time. Herc, Carver, Sydnor and Greggs make a labored arrest of the package carrier, but let Stinkum get away so as to not compromise the wiretap. Stinkum pages Stringer from outside the towers and Sydnor rushes over to photograph him as the call is returned, so they can legally monitor the phone call. In interrogation, Prez recognizes the carrier as Kevin Johnston, the boy he blinded in one eye. Daniels appeals to Johnston to contact him if he ever wants to change his life; Johnston mocks his offer.

McNulty and Pearlman meet with Phelan, who agrees to back the detectives. Phelan is surprised that Daniels stood up for the wiretaps, and worries that McNulty no longer trusts him since the Gant murder hit the newspapers. McNulty feels that he cannot trust anyone at the moment. Daniels attends a fundraiser with his wife, Marla. Also in attendance are Burrell and State Senator Clay Davis. Daniels finds himself in the kitchen with Davis' driver, Damien "Day-Day" Price, who is viewing the house's valuables. He speculates about the profit that could be made by burglarizing the home until Daniels reveals that he is a police officer.

Rawls gives Santangelo an ultimatum: if he wishes to remain in Homicide, he must either clear at least one of his unsolved cases by day's end or inform on McNulty. Landsman jokingly recommends a psychic, Madame LaRue, and a desperate Santangelo follows his advice; the psychic turns out to be a phony. McNulty and Bunk work the Gant case based on Omar's tip that Bird was involved. They canvass the buildings opposite the crime scene looking for witnesses and find an older woman who corroborates Omar's story and is willing to testify. Based on Omar's tip, the Barksdale detail tracks down and apprehends Bird. A ballistics test confirms that his gun was used to kill Gant.

After Bird refuses to cooperate and profanely insults the interrogators, he is beaten by Daniels, Landsman, and Greggs. Omar gives a statement to Bunk, criticizing Bird for killing a civilian. When Bunk asks Omar if he has any other tips on old murders, he gives information about Denise Redding, which happens to be one of Santangelo's open cases. McNulty relays Omar's information to Santangelo, who in gratitude warns McNulty that Rawls is after him. McNulty visits Pearlman to discuss his worries about Rawls, as he loves the job too much for Rawls to take it from him.

The street 

Greggs gets Johnny out of his charge for possession on Bubbles' behalf; part of his deal involves going into a treatment program. Bubbles and Johnny attend a Narcotics Anonymous meeting as part of the deal. Bubbles is impressed by the speaker, Walon, and declares that he has a strong desire to live at the end of the meeting.

D'Angelo visits Orlando's to see Avon. Orlando tells D'Angelo he has a proposition for him. Later, in the pit, Orlando asks him to help sell some cocaine from New Orleans behind Avon's back; D'Angelo tells Orlando he will have to think about it.

In the office of Orlando's, Stringer berates Stinkum for talking on the phone and insists that something is wrong in D'Angelo's crew. Avon tells D'Angelo to change up and stop all trade for now. He also worries that the police do not seem to be onto Stinkum, as they should have connected him through the truck's plate number already. In the pit, Bodie quizzes Poot about Wallace, who has holed up in his squat and started taking drugs since Brandon's murder. Stringer orders them to rip out the payphones in the pit and to vary which payphones they use, not using the same one more than once per day.

Production

Title reference

The title of this episode seemingly refers to the arrest of Bird for the murder of William Gant, the major event of the episode.  As the wiretaps are killed by the payphone removal, "One Arrest"—that of Kevin Johnston, the runner—is also the sum total of progress the unit made from information gathered from the wire.

Another interpretation of the title is that it refers to Rawls's demand that Santangelo close at least one case; for a homicide case to be considered "closed" only requires that a suspect be arrested and charged.  After the suspect is charged, the murder is considered closed/solved even if the suspect is not convicted; this is why, earlier in the season, Rawls pushes for arrests on murders in order to help the statistics, even though the cases are weak.

Epigraph

Bunk uses this phrase when Omar discusses his rules for life on the street. It also refers to the codes that the law and the street also follow, such as that there should be no talking on phones about business which Stinkum breaks resulting in being berated by Stringer.

Credits

Guest stars

First appearances
This episode marks the first appearance of Senator Clay Davis and his aide Damien Price, establishing the first link to the political plotline that will become prominent in seasons 3–5. This is also the first appearance of Walon, Bubbles's sponsor and friend.

References

External links
"One Arrest" at HBO.com

The Wire (season 1) episodes
2002 American television episodes